Halil Umut Meler (born 1 August 1986) is a Turkish football referee. He has been FIFA listed since 2017 and a member of the UEFA Elite since 2022. He has officiated in 2017–18 UEFA Europa League, beginning with the match between Vojvodina and Ružomberok on 29 June 2017.

See also
List of football referees

References

1986 births
Living people
Sportspeople from İzmir
Turkish football referees
UEFA Champions League referees
UEFA Europa League referees